The Padania representative football team is an unofficial football team that represents Padania, a geographical region composed by the eight regions of Northern Italy. The team is not a member of UEFA, nor is it affiliated with the Italian Football Federation. They have established the Lega Federale Calcio Padania.

Padania had gained provisional membership of the NF-Board in 2008 and was able to take part in the 2008 VIVA World Cup along with Arameans Suryoye, Iraqi Kurdistan, Provence and Sápmi, which they won beating the Arameans Suryoye football team in the final by 2–0. Padania retained their crown when they hosted the 2009 finals, beating Kurdistan in the final. They defeated the Kurds again in 2010 to lift their third VIVA World Cup. Their non-appearance at the 2012 finals meant they didn't make it to four consecutive titles.
Now the team is a member of ConIFA.

Tournament records

World Cup record

European Cup record

Selected internationals

Current squad
The following players were called up to the 2018 ConIFA World Football Cup

Head Coach:  Arturo Merlo

Important personalities

Managers

Presidents of the Padania FA

References

CONIFA member associations
European N.F.-Board teams
Football teams in Italy
Sport in Lombardy
Sport in Aosta Valley
Sport in Emilia-Romagna
Sport in Friuli-Venezia Giulia
Sport in Liguria
Sport in Piedmont
Sport in Trentino-Alto Adige/Südtirol
Sport in Veneto